Lorenzo Fellon (born 15 July 2004) is a French motorcycle rider, competing in the Moto3 World Championship for CIP Green Power Team.

Career

Early career

2019
During the 2019 season, Lorenzo Fellon participated in the 2019 Red Bull MotoGP Rookies Cup. His season was good, he finished all twelve races of the championship in the points. His best result was a fourth place finish in the last race of the season at Aragón. He finished the season fifth in the standings collecting 116 points, and was one of only two riders to not retire from any round.

2020
Fellon made his debut in the 2020 FIM CEV Moto3 Junior World Championship with Junior team 0,0 Estrella Galicia. He did not start the season well, in the two races in Portugal, he did not score any points, and in the first race in Jerez, he retired due to a crash. But from the second Jerez race onwards, until the last race of the championship in Valencia, he scored points in all races, obtaining his best result of 4th in the first race at Aragón.

Moto3 World Championship

Sic58 Squadra Corse (2021–2022)
In 2021 Fellon debuted in the Moto3 World Championship with SIC58 Squadra Corse. He was the only full-time rider to not score a point in the 2021 season.

CIP Green Power (from 2023)
From 2023 season, he will competed for the CIP Green Power racing team.

Career statistics

Grand Prix motorcycle racing

By season

By class

Races by year
(key) (Races in bold indicate pole position; races in italics indicate fastest lap)

References

External links

Living people
2004 births
French motorcycle racers
Sportspeople from Avignon
Moto3 World Championship riders